E-sara (Cuneiform:   "House of the Universe"), was the temple dedicated to Inanna in Uruk by Ur-Nammu (reigned c. 2112 BC – 2094 BC).

In the Enuma Elish, E-sara was created by Marduk at the end of Tablet IV, as he divided Tiamat into two halves, and created a "House of Heaven", for Anu, Bel, and Ea.

External links
 The full surviving text of the Enûma Elish

Buildings and structures completed in the 22nd century BC
Buildings and structures completed in the 21st century BC
Ancient Near East temples
Mesopotamian religion
Enūma Eliš
Uruk
Inanna